Manuel Sulaimán (born 20 July 2000, in Mexico City, Mexico) is a Mexican racing driver. who most recently raced in the 2022 Indy Lights for HMD Motorsports.

Racing career
Sulaimán started the 2021 Indy Pro 2000 Championship with Juncos Hollinger Racing, winning one race. He left the team mid-season and joined HMD Motorsports in the 2021 Indy Lights series for Portland.

Racing record

Career summary 

*Season still in progress.

American open–wheel racing results

Indy Lights

References

External links

2000 births
Living people
Racing drivers from Mexico City
U.S. F2000 National Championship drivers
Indy Pro 2000 Championship drivers
Indy Lights drivers

British F4 Championship drivers
Juncos Hollinger Racing drivers
Dale Coyne Racing drivers
JHR Developments drivers
NACAM F4 Championship drivers
HMD Motorsports drivers